Olga Kazakova (born May 30, 1968, in the city of Usolye-Sibirskoye, in the Soviet Union) is a Russian politician, was the Minister of Culture of the Stavropol Krai, since 2012, deputy of the State Duma, First Deputy Chairman of the Committee on Culture.

Career 
Born in the family of an officer in the Soviet army, she lived with her family in the city of Lugansk, Ukrainian SSR. In 1990 she graduated from University of Luhansk with a degree in Russian language and literature. She is a Komsomol member.

From 1984 to 1991 at the Komsomol work, head of the children's dance club, kindergarten teacher. From 1992 to 1996, a primary school teacher in Vorkuta and Nevinnomyssk.

From 2000 to 2003, an assistant to a deputy of the city parliament of the city of Stavropol, executive director of the Slavyansk Sports Center. From 2003 to 2009, he was the head of the youth affairs department of the Administration of the city of Stavropol. From 2009 to 2011, chairman of the Committee on Youth Affairs of the Government of the Stavropol Krai. From 2011 to 2012, the Minister of Culture of the Government of the Stavropol Krai.

May 22, 2012, deputy of the State Duma of the sixth convocation of the United Russia fraction on the All-Russia People's Front quota from the Stavropol Territory, member of the State Duma Committee on Family, Women and Children.

In 2016, according to the primaries of United Russia, it took 1st place (78% of the vote) in the single-member constituency. Re-elected deputy of the State Duma of the seventh convocation, elected first deputy chairman of the Committee on Culture.

References

1968 births
Living people
People from Stavropol
Komsomol
United Russia politicians
University of Luhansk alumni
21st-century Russian women politicians
Sixth convocation members of the State Duma (Russian Federation)
Seventh convocation members of the State Duma (Russian Federation)
Eighth convocation members of the State Duma (Russian Federation)